Julia Weist (born 1984) is an American visual artist. Themes in Weist's work include archival science, Knowledge organization, media distribution, algorithmic technology, history and politics. Weist often uses found images and media to create photographs, video, installations, sculptures, artist books and public artworks.

Early life and education 
Weist was born in 1984 in New York, NY. Weist holds a BFA from The Cooper Union and a MLIS from Pratt Institute.

Public artworks and response
In 2015 Weist's public artwork Reach went viral. The artwork consistent of a single word ("parbunkells"), that had never been used on the internet, installed on a billboard in Forest Hills, Queens. The public response to the project was wide-ranging and there was an extensive amount of social media activity related to the billboard. Entrepreneurial attempts to capitalize on the project included the creation of T-shirts and other merchandise on Redbubble and the sale of a domain using the word parbunkells which was listed on eBay for $20,000. In a work called After, About, With Weist spent two years, from 2013-2015, manipulating the search results for the artist Haim Steinbach as way to explore how meaning about artists' work is codified online. Weist was selected for a public artwork commission initiated by the Department of Cultural Affairs in New York City in 2019. As part of that project, she embedded with the NYC Department of Records and Information Services and created artworks that were classified as government records. In 2022 Weist's second billboard-based project premiered in Times Square. In this work, Weist advertised a short film she made called Governing Body and chose to use a promotional design for the film that Motion Picture Association of America disapproved for public use. The National Coalition Against Censorship issued a statement of support for Weist's Times Square billboard, calling on the Motion Picture Association to update it's standards.

Exhibitions
Weist's work has been presented in museum exhibitions including 17.(SEPT) [By WeistSiréPC]™ at the Queens Museum, NY in 2017, Open Call at The Shed (arts center) in 2019, The Book Lovers at the Museum of Contemporary Art, Antwerp in 2013 and Art In The Age Of…Planetary Computation at Kunstinstituut Melly in 2015 among several others. Weist participated in the 12th Gwangju Biennale. Her most recent solo exhibition was with Rachel Uffner Gallery in 2022.

Recognition
In 2015, Weist was given a national advertising award from the Out of Home Advertising Association of America for her public artwork Reach. She received the Net-based Audience Prize from Haus der Elektronischen Künste (Basel, Switzerland) in 2016.

Books
Weist is the author of the novel Sexy Librarian.

Notable works in public collections

Definitions (2020), Metropolitan Museum of Art, New York
Demonstration (2020), Museum of Modern Art, New York
From the Future (2020), Art Institute of Chicago
Giuliani (2020), Brooklyn Museum
International (2020), Pennsylvania Academy of the Fine Arts
Rubrics (2020), MIT List Visual Arts Center

References

Interdisciplinary artists
21st-century American artists
1984 births
Living people
21st-century American women artists
Cooper Union alumni